Coming Out is a novel by Danielle Steel, published by Random House in June 2006. The book is Steel's sixty-ninth novel.

Synopsis
Olympia Crawford Rubinstein, lawyer, wife and mother to twin daughters, a son in college and one in kindergarten, Olympia' life is perfect. Until she opens an invitation for her daughters to attend the most exclusive coming-out ball in New York–and chaos erupts all around her. One twin is outraged whilst the other is ecstatic. Her husband is appalled and as her family is thrown into disarray, the ball turns out to be a blessing in disguise as old wounds are healed and the family learn acceptance and love are all they ever needed.

Footnotes
http://www.randomhouse.com/features/steel/bookshelf/display.pperl?isbn=9780385338325

2006 American novels
American romance novels
Novels by Danielle Steel
Delacorte Press books